"Stardust" is a song recorded by German recording artist Lena. It was written by Rosi Golan and Tim Myers and produced by Swen Meyer for her third studio album Stardust (2012). The song was released on September 21, 2012.

Background and release
"Stardust" was composed by Israeli-American singer-songwriter Rosi Golan, and American musician Tim Myers, a former member of OneRepublic. Golan had previously written the songs "Bee" and "I Like You", which also have been recorded and performed by Meyer-Landrut. In 2010, "Bee" was Meyer-Landrut's second best-selling track reaching number three on the German Singles Chart.

The song was presented for the first time on July 30, 2012, in Munich during a promotional event. Its radio premiere was on August 8, 2012. The first international presentation was during the 40th anniversary of Porsche Design in Beverly Hills, Los Angeles on September 4. The track was released on CD single and as a digital download as the first single from Meyer-Landrut's same-titled third album on September 21, 2012, in Germany, Austria and Switzerland. The single features the song "Time" which does not appear on the album. This song is a Ben's Brother cover, written by Ian Mack and Jamie Hartman.

In December 2012 it received a Gold certification in Germany for more than 150,000 sold copies and downloads. It was also chosen as title track for the film  (Jesus liebt mich), which was released in German cinemas on Christmas 2012.

In March 2014, it was first used as promotional music by the British TV channel ITV for their spring-summer programming advert.

In 2014, the original composer Rosi Golan performed an own version for the soundtrack of the film You're Not You starring Hilary Swank and Emmy Rossum.

Music video
The music video was shot in August 2012 in a Spanish semi-desert. It was released on 7 September 2012. The director was Bode Brodmüller who previously worked with Joy Denalane, Max Herre, and Jan Delay. The video is focused on Lena who is either dancing, standing, running and laying on the floor in several dresses or is bathing. The women in the background are covered with mud.

On 21 March 2013, the music video was awarded as best video at the German ECHO Awards.

Track listing

Personnel

Writers: Rosi Golan, Tim Myers
Producer: Swen Meyer
Lead vocals: Lena Meyer-Landrut
Guitar, glockenspiel: Marcus Schneider
Drums: Reiner "Kallas" Hubert

Bass: Felix Weigt
Piano: Arne Straube
Percussion: Swen Meyer
Cello: Hagen Kuhr
Background vocals: Ruben Seevers, Anna Katharina Bauer, Mo Bahla

Charts

Weekly charts

Year-end charts

Certifications

Awards and nominations

Release history

References

2012 singles
Lena Meyer-Landrut songs
2012 songs
Songs written by Tim Myers
Songs written by Rosi Golan